MemeStreams is an early social networking website, online community, and blog host that was established in 2001 by Industrial Memetics.

Created by Tom Cross and Nick Levay, the site is particularly popular among computer security professionals. Michael Lynn (Ciscogate), Virgil Griffith (Wikiscanner), Billy Hoffman (Ajax Security), and Dolemite (organizer of PhreakNIC) are all members of the site.

Memestreams employs a reputation system.

References

External links
Official site

American social networking websites
American news websites
Social bookmarking websites
Internet properties established in 2001